Edwin "Eddie" "Ted" Spicer (20 September 1922 – 25 December 2004) was a professional English footballer who played for Liverpool. His parents were George Stephen Spicer (1894-1956) and Ethel Anne Warren (1900-1981). He was married to Norma Anne Roberts (1926-2002). They were married in March 1946 in Wrexham and they had two children.

Career

Born in Liverpool, England, the 17-year-old Spicer signed professional forms for Liverpool in October 1939 after impressing manager George Kay. Like so many professional players, Spicer's career was interrupted by the outbreak of the Second World War, due to this Eddie's 'official' debut was seven years after he first signed.

Immediately after World War II, in which Eddie served in the Marines, Spicer returned to Liverpool and was finally given his debut on 30 January 1946 in the first post-war competition the FA Cup. It was a 4th round 2nd leg tie at Anfield a game the Reds won 2–0. Unfortunately for both Spicer and Liverpool, opponents, Bolton Wanderers had already won the first leg 5–0, subsequently knocking Liverpool out of the cup.

Spicer had to wait until 6 December 1947 for his first goal for the club, Aston Villa were the visitors to Anfield for a league game that ended in a 3–3 draw.

Eddie made 10 appearances during Liverpool's first championship winning team for 24 years in 1946–47, just short of the total required to gain himself a medal. His only medal came in the FA Cup of 1950, Spicer appeared in all of Liverpool's seven matches including the final on 29 April, the Merseysider's first ever Wembley final, unfortunately, Arsenal were the opposition and spoilt the day by recording a 2–0 victory.

Spicer, was a tough, no-nonsense defender, primarily left-sided, and he was a regular fixture in the Liverpool side during the late 40s and early 50s. He suffered with injuries, however, missing the entire 1951–52 season with a broken leg, and suffering the same injury in 1953, an injury that would eventually end his career prematurely.

Despite suffering numerous injuries throughout his career, Spicer managed 168 appearances for Liverpool, scoring twice.

Statistics and honours

Liverpool F.C. (1939–1953) - 168 appearances, 2 goals - FA Cup runners-up medal (1950)

References

External links
Player profile at LFChistory.net

1922 births
English footballers
Association football defenders
Liverpool F.C. players
Footballers from Liverpool
2004 deaths
FA Cup Final players